Joshilaay is a 1989 Indian Hindi-language film directed by Sibte Hassan Rizvi. The film stars Sunny Deol, Anil Kapoor, Sridevi, Meenakshi Sheshadri, Kulbhushan Kharbanda and Rajesh Vivek. The music was composed by R. D. Burman.

Plot 
The film revolves around two men -  Dara (Sunny Deol) and Karan (Anil Kapoor) . Both were wronged by Jogi Thakur (Rajesh Vivek) and his partner Raja Singh (Kulbhushan Kharbanda). Dara was separated from his family and left near a circus where he was brought up and Karan's family was murdered in front of him. After Jogi and Raja rob a village, they are nabbed by the police. In the chase, Raja betrays Jogi and hands him over to the police, running away with the loot himself.

Twenty years later, Raja Singh has become Raja Saab, a dreaded ruler of many villages and a respected man. Dara and Karan are both grown men now thirsting for revenge. Where Dara is the fun and witty type, Karan is the silent and angry type. They are helped in their quest by Gulabo (Sridevi) who is Dara's girlfriend and Mangala (Meenakshi Sheshadri) who is Karan's girlfriend. Jogi Thakur is also released from jail and thirsts for revenge against Raja. The twists occurs when Dara wants Jogi Thakur alive to find who his parents were and Karan wants Jogi Thakur dead.

Dara and Karan eventually become friends. They confront Jogi Thakur and Raja Saab and drag them to death.

Production 
The film was mostly directed by Shekhar Kapur, who left the movie mid-way. Sibte Hasan Rizvi took over and completed the film. The film was shot on location in Leh and Ladakh.

Cast 
 Sunny Deol as Dara
 Anil Kapoor as Karan
 Sridevi as Gulabo
 Meenakshi Sheshadri as Mangala
 Satish Kaushik as Bachchu Lal
 Kulbhushan Kharbanda as Raja Singh / Raja Sahib
 Rajesh Vivek as Jogi Thakur
 Bharat Bhushan as Mangala's Father
 Hemant Mishra as Surkhiya
 Anirudh Agarwal as Damroo
 Satyen Kappu as Circus Manager
 Pradeep Rawat as Goon
 Deep Dhillon as Goon

Soundtrack 
R. D. Burman composed the music for the film, and the lyrics were given by Javed Akhtar. "Joshilaay Woh Shehzade Hain Zameen Ke" was the last song by the duo of Kishore Kumar and R. D. Burman.

References

External links 
 

1989 films
1980s Hindi-language films
1980s action drama films
Films scored by R. D. Burman
1980s buddy films
Indian buddy films
Indian action drama films
Indian films about revenge
1989 drama films